The 2008 Argentina rugby union tour of Europe was a series of matches played in November 2008 in Europe by the Argentina national team. Coached by Santiago Phelan, the Argentine national side toured on France, Italy and Ireland playing a total of three matches thereof. Argentina beat Italy and lost to France and Ireland.

Touring party

Coaching staff 
 Head coach: Santiago Phelan
 Assistant coach: Fabián Turnes
 Assistant coach: Marcelo Reggiardo

Players 

 Horacio Agulla (Brive)
 Patricio Albacete (Stade Toulousain)
 Rimas Álvarez Kairelis (Perpignan)
 Miguel Avramovic (Montauban)
 Marcos Ayerza  (Leicester Tigers)
 Nicolás Bruzzone (San Isidro Club)
 Alejandro Campos (ASM Clermont Auvergne)
 Rafael Carballo (Castres Olympique)
 Mauro Comuzzi (Pucará)
 Felipe Contepomi (Leinster) (captain)
 Martín Durand (Champagnat)
 Juan Martín Fernández Lobbe (Sale Sharks)
 Santiago Fernandez (Hindú)
 Juan Figallo (Jockey Club Salta)
 Agustin Figuerola (C.A. San Isidro)
 Mariano Galarza (Universitario LP)
 Álvaro Galindo (Racing Metro)
 Eusebio Guiñazú (Agen)
 Juan Martín Hernández (Stade Francais)
 Mario Ledesma (ASM Clermont Auvergne)
 Juan Manuel Leguizamón (Stade Francais)
 Francisco Leonelli (Saracens)
 Esteban Lozada  (Toulon)
 Federico Martín Aramburú (Dax)
 Juan Pablo Orlandi (Rovigo)
 Rodrigo Roncero  (Stade Francais) 
 Bernardo Stortoni (Glasgow Warriors)
 Gonzalo Tiesi  (Harlequins)
 Nicolas Vergallo (Dax)
 Alberto Vernet Basualdo (Stade Toulousain)

Match summary

Match details

References

2008 rugby union tours
rugby
2008
2008–09 in European rugby union
2008–09 in French rugby union
2008–09 in Italian rugby union
2008–09 in Irish rugby union
2008
2008
2008
History of rugby union matches between Argentina and Ireland